Norbert Nachtweih (born 4 June 1957) is a German former professional footballer who played as a midfielder.

He played in 325 Bundesliga games over the course of 13 seasons (46 goals), playing for Eintracht Frankfurt and Bayern Munich and winning eight major titles combined, including four national championships with the latter.

Career
Born in Sangerhausen, East Germany, Nachtweih moved to West Germany in 1976, signing with Eintracht Frankfurt, for which he appeared as a midfielder over the course of five Bundesliga seasons, scoring 25 goals in his last three years combined and winning the 1979–80 UEFA Cup (11 appearances, one goal) against fellow league side Borussia Mönchengladbach.

In the 1982 summer, Nachtweih joined FC Bayern Munich, contributing with 85 games and ten goals as the Bavarians won three consecutive national championships from 1985–87 (of the four he conquered with the team during his spell), and also being regularly played as a defender. In 1989, the 32-year-old moved to France and signed for AS Cannes, partnering a young Zinedine Zidane in two Ligue 1 seasons, and helping the club qualify to the UEFA Cup in his first.

After a brief spell with Eintracht, Nachtweih signed with second division's SV Waldhof Mannheim in December 1991. He retired from professional football after five seasons at the age of 39, but still competed a few years at the amateur level.

After his active career, Nachtweih managed SV Bernbach and FK Pirmasens (first as a youth coach). Subsequently, he returned to Eintracht Frankfurt, working in the club's football academy.

Defection
In October 1976, following an under-21 international game, Nachtweih fled to West Germany via Turkey alongside Jürgen Pahl, being suspended one year by FIFA. Even though he was one of the best German footballers in the 1980s, FIFA formalities forbade a career in the West German national team, as he had previously appeared with East Germany.

Honours
Eintracht Frankfurt
UEFA Cup: 1979–80
DFB-Pokal: 1980–81

Bayern Munich
Bundesliga: 1984–85, 1985–86, 1986–87, 1988–89
DFB-Pokal: 1983–84, 1985–86; runner-up 1984–85
European Cup: runner-up 1986–87
DFL-Supercup: 1987

See also
List of Eastern Bloc defectors

References

External links
 
 FootballStats profile 

1957 births
Living people
People from Sangerhausen
People from Bezirk Halle
German footballers
East German footballers
Footballers from Saxony-Anhalt
Association football defenders
Association football midfielders
East Germany under-21 international footballers
DDR-Oberliga players
Bundesliga players
2. Bundesliga players
Ligue 1 players
Hallescher FC players
Eintracht Frankfurt players
FC Bayern Munich footballers
SV Waldhof Mannheim players
AS Cannes players
German football managers
Eintracht Frankfurt non-playing staff
East German defectors
East German emigrants to West Germany
UEFA Cup winning players
German expatriate footballers
German expatriate sportspeople in France
Expatriate footballers in France